The University of Koblenz and Landau is a public university located in Koblenz and Landau, Germany, founded in 1990.

History and profile

The University of Koblenz and Landau is one of the youngest universities in Germany. It was transformed from a teachers' training college in 1990. Since then, new Departments and Institutes have been founded, new Degrees and Chairs have been created, while at the same time existing courses and research interests have been expanded. The university's academic profile today is marked by a combination of Computer Science and Psychology together with the traditional Departments of Education, the Humanities, and Natural Science.

Since 1990 the number of students has more than quadrupled. There are now more than 16,000 students registered. What makes Koblenz and Landau attractive as places to study is the wide range of courses and the orientation of these courses towards the practical world of work.

Research at Koblenz and Landau is above all oriented towards practical application. The transfer of academic work through co-operation with partners from industry, commerce and administration is of great importance. As a young university it has the necessary openness and flexibility to respond to the demand for work in the realms of research, development, consultancy, and provision of expert opinion.

The University emphasizes further education and provides a number of graduate programmes and courses in this area with continual expansion. Further education is the subject of numerous, usually interdisciplinary research projects.

A special feature of the University of Koblenz and Landau is its structure. Koblenz and Landau are the locations for research, teaching, and further education. The organising link between the two campuses is the President's Office in Mainz, home of the university executive and the central university administration.

As a result of the state law on restructuring, the University of Koblenz-Landau was split up as of 1 January 2023. The Landau location merged with the Technical University of Kaiserslautern to form the University of Kaiserslautern-Landau, the Koblenz location will continue as the University of Koblenz.

See also

 List of colleges and universities
 Koblenz
 Landau

References

External links
  

Educational institutions established in 1990
University of Koblenz-Landau
1990 establishments in Germany
Landau
University of Koblenz and Landau
Universities and colleges in Rhineland-Palatinate